The Autódromo Ciudad de Rafaela is a motor racing circuit in Rafaela, Santa Fe, Argentina built in 1952 and paved in 1966.

Owner 

The venue – owned by Atlético de Rafaela – hosted the 500 Millas Argentinas race until 1971. The USAC Rafaela Indy 300 race was held at the Autódromo in 1971, won by Al Unser in a Colt-Ford Turbo.

Events

The circuit has hosted TC2000 Championship, Turismo Carretera, Top Race V6, and the Formula Three Sudamericana:

 Current

 March: TC2000 Championship, Fórmula Nacional Argentina

 Former
 Formula 3 Sudamericana (1988, 1997, 2005)
 Top Race V6 (2000, 2006, 2022)
 Turismo Carretera (1953–1955, 1966–1968, 1987, 1993–1997, 1999–2005, 2007–2019, 2021–2022)
 USAC Rafaela Indy 300 (1971)

Lap records 

The official fastest race lap records at the Autódromo Ciudad de Rafaela are listed as:

References

External links
 Autódromo Ciudad de Rafaela
 Google Maps - Autódromo Ciudad de Rafaela
 OpenStreetMap - Rafaela racing track

Motorsport venues in Santa Fe Province
Atlético de Rafaela